Daniel Smith (sometimes advertised as "Daniel Smith Artists' Materials" or "Daniel Smith Art Supply") is an art supply manufacturer and retailer. Dan Smith, a noted printmaking artist, founded the operation in 1976, endeavoring to produce artist grade printmaking ink.  Later, watercolors and oil paints were added to its products.

Daniel Smith's paint manufacturing facility is located in Seattle, Washington, where it mills pigments and mixes the final paint product.

One of the unique approaches to paint that the company focuses on is the use of pigments derived from semi-precious minerals and other unique geological deposits. The PrimaTek® collection of colors has paints derived from turquoise, amethyst, lapis lazuli, rhodonite, kyanite and serpentine.

Bibliography
 Gragg, Randy  "Daniel Smith Takes A Detour" The Oregonian [Portland, Or] 13 Sep 1998: F06.
 Massa, Leslie. "Daniel Smith, 1995/1996" Catalog Age 13. 9 (Sep 1996): 95. 
 Miller, Paul. "Good hygiene works for Daniel Smith" Catalog Age'' 19. 7 (Jun 2002): 49.

References

External links
 

Art materials brands
Online retailers of the United States
Mail-order retailers
Retail companies established in 1976
Companies based in Seattle
Oil paint brands
Artists' acrylic paint brands
Watercolor brands
1976 establishments in Washington (state)